Ring Ring is the debut studio album by the Swedish group ABBA, initially credited as Björn & Benny, Agnetha & Frida. It was released in Scandinavia on 26 March 1973, and later in a limited number of other territories, including West Germany, Australia, South Africa and Mexico, through Polar Music.  It was a chart-topping album in Belgium, and a big success in the Netherlands, Norway and South Africa.

The album was re-released in Australasia in 1975, but was not released in the United Kingdom until 1992, and the United States until 1995.

Overview 
When the first song "People Need Love" was recorded in the spring of 1972, the group was just one of many projects the four members were involved in. Only after the title track, "Ring Ring" became a hit, did the four decide to go on working together as a permanent group. The original 1973 Polar version of the album opens with "Ring Ring (Bara du slog en signal)", the Swedish version of the track, and places the English-language version as track four on side two.

The track "She's My Kind of Girl", included on the international editions, was originally recorded by Björn & Benny in 1969 for the Swedish pornographic film Inga II: the Seduction of Inga. Released as a single in 1970, it became a hit in Japan, and was released as the B-side of the English version of the "Ring Ring" single in Scandinavia. The track "Disillusion" was originally written in Swedish by Agnetha Fältskog for her solo album Elva kvinnor i ett hus. Although she had composed much of her Swedish solo output, "Disillusion" is the only song released on an ABBA studio album to feature a songwriting contribution from her.

Ring Ring was first released on CD in Scandinavia in 1988 by Polar Music alongside Waterloo and ABBA's self titled album. It follows the same running order as the original Scandinavian LP, being the only CD of this album to do so. Also in 1988, the international version was first released on CD in Australia by Rainbow Music Group. In 1990, the international version of the album was released on CD throughout Europe by Polydor Records with the discs manufactured in West Germany. In the United States, Ring Ring would not be made available on CD - or indeed at all - until 1995 when it was released there by Polydor. The album has been digitally remastered on CD multiple times: in 1997 as part of "The ABBA Remasters" series, in 2001 with an updated cover artwork and some bonus tracks, in 2005 as part of The Complete Studio Recordings box set, and most recently in 2013 as a "Deluxe Edition".

Track listing

Notes
All reissues above use the international edition track listing.

Personnel
 Agnetha Fältskog – vocals
 Anni-Frid Lyngstad – vocals
 Björn Ulvaeus – acoustic guitar, vocals
 Benny Andersson – piano, keyboards, mellotron, vocals

Additional musicians
 Ola Brunkert – drums
 Roger Palm – drums on "Me and Bobby and Bobby's brother" and "Rock 'n' roll band"
 Jan Bandel - drums on "He is your brother"
 Rutger Gunnarsson – bass
 Mike Watson – bass on "Disillusion", "People need love", "I saw it in the mirror" and "Love isn't easy"
 Stefan Brolund - bass on "He is your brother"
 Janne Schaffer – acoustic guitar on "Another town, another train", electric guitar
 Håkan Jansson - baritone saxophone on "He is your brother"

Production
 Benny Andersson; Björn Ulvaeus – producers, arrangers
 Michael B. Tretow – engineer
 Björn Almstedt; Lennart Karlsmyr; Rune Persson – assistant engineers
 Sven-Olof Walldoff – string arrangements on "I Am Just a Girl"
 Lars Falck; Bengt H. Malmqvist – photography
 Peter Wiking – original album design
 Jon Astley; Tim Young; Michael B. Tretow – remastering for the 1997 remasters
 Jon Astley; Michael B. Tretow – remastering for the 2001 remasters
 Henrik Jonsson – remastering for The Complete Studio Recordings box set

Charts

Certifications and sales

References

External links
 

1973 debut albums
ABBA albums
Albums produced by Benny Andersson
Albums produced by Björn Ulvaeus
Benny Andersson albums
Björn Ulvaeus albums
Polar Music albums